Alice of Majorca (1341 – after 1376) was a Cypriot noblewoman, the great-granddaughter of King James II of Majorca and granddaughter of King Hugh IV of Cyprus. Her husband was Philip of Ibelin, seneschal of Cyprus who was sent to prison in Genoa after his murder of Alicia's uncle, King Peter I. She became the mistress of Jean de Moustry, Grand Admiral of Cyprus.

Family
She was born in Cyprus in 1341, the only child of Ferdinand, Viscount of Omélas, and Eschive de Lusignan, eldest daughter of King Hugh IV of Cyprus and Alix of Ibelin. Her paternal grandfather was Ferdinand, son of King James II of Majorca. At the time of her birth, her mother was being held in captivity by her grandfather King Hugh as a result of the latter's violent quarrel with Alice's father, Fernando, who had been expelled from the kingdom. The King had accused Ferdinand's mother, Isabella of Ibelin, of having practised sorcery. As her father died in exile in Omélas, sometime between the time of her birth and 1347, Alice never knew him.

Marriage
On 26 July 1355, she married, as his second wife, one of her kinsmen, Philip of Ibelin, son of Balian. As they were related within the prohibited degrees, a papal dispensation was required for their marriage. Her uncle, who in 1358 had succeeded Hugh IV as King Peter I of Cyprus, was much displeased with Philip's marriage to Alice, who being his niece, was a close member of the Cypriot royal family. The King, in retaliation for Philip's temerity in marrying Alice, banished him from the kingdom. Alice was forcibly detained on the island, and forbidden to follow her husband in exile. It is not known whether or not she had any children by Philip.

Her mother had died in 1363 during an outbreak of plague. Four years later, in 1367, Philip returned to Cyprus, and in 1369 assumed the role as leader of a revolt against King Peter, and of the group of barons who subsequently assassinated him. After the regicide, Peter's son, Peter, who was a minor, succeeded him, with his mother Eleanor, and his uncles John and James acting as his regents. Eleanor suspected John and James of having been part of the plot to murder Peter II. Philip was immediately appointed seneschal of Cyprus; however, following the Genoese invasion in 1373 (which Queen Eleanor had secretly arranged), he was first imprisoned at Famagusta, then sent to prison in Genoa, where he was beheaded in 1374/76.

Love affairs

In 1370, according to Rudt-Collenberg, Alice became the mistress of Jean de Moustry, the Grand Admiral of Cyprus. As with her husband, it is not recorded whether any children were born to her as a result of her affair with the admiral. There were also rumours that she had an affair with Genoese Admiral Pietro di Campo Fregosa, who had connived at her husband's death. It was recorded in the Chronicle of Amadi that Alicia was so in love with the Genoese admiral that she had failed to intervene on Philip's behalf in order to save him from execution.

Alice died on an unrecorded date sometime after 1376.

References

1341 births
Year of death unknown
House of Aragon
House of Ibelin
14th-century Cypriot people
Women of the Crusader states